Hamo Beknazarian (19 May 1891 – 27 April 1965), also known as Hamo Bek-Nazarov or Amo Bek-Nazarian, was a Soviet Armenian film director, actor and screenwriter.

Biography
Hamo Beknazarian was born on 19 May 1891 in Yerevan, the capital of Armenia, Russian Empire. His career in cinema started in 1914, when a casual acquaintance offered him a part in a film. Since that part, he decided to pursue a career in cinema. Between 1914 and 1918, he played about 70 parts, becoming a popular actor in pre-Revolutionary Russian film. In 1920, instead of going to Armenia as he had decided, he went to Tbilisi where he developed a film department for the Georgian Commissioner's office of Public Education. He shot many films in Tbilisi, including Patricide and Lost Treasures. In 1925, he shot his first Armenian film and moved to Armenia. In 1933, he shot the first Armenian sound film Pepo. In 1941, Beknazarian was awarded the Stalin Prize. Besides feature films, he also shot a few documentaries.

Hamo Beknazarian died on 27 April 1965 in Moscow, USSR.

Filmography
 1922: The Suram Fortress, actor
 1923: Patricide, director
 1925: Namus, scriptwriter, director 
 1925: The Case of Tariel Mklavadze's Murder, director
 1926: Natela, director
 1926: Shor and Shorshor, scriptwriter, director
 1927: Zare, scriptwriter, director
 1928: Khaspush, co-scriptwriter, director
 1928: The House on the Volcano, co-scriptwriter, director
 1943: David-Bek, co-scriptwriter, director
 1935: Pepo, scriptwriter, director
 1938: Zangezur, co-scriptwriter, director
 1947: Anahit, director

References

External links

 
 Brief biography and filmography by the Armenian Association of Film Critics and Cinema Journalists

1891 births
1965 deaths
20th-century Armenian male actors
20th-century screenwriters
Film people from Yerevan
Male actors from Yerevan
People's Artists of Armenia
Stalin Prize winners
Recipients of the Order of Lenin
Recipients of the Order of the Red Banner of Labour
Recipients of the Order of the Red Star
Armenian film directors
Armenian male film actors
Armenian male silent film actors
Armenian screenwriters
Soviet Armenians
Soviet film directors

Soviet male film actors
Soviet male silent film actors
Soviet screenwriters